Michelle Mary Teresa Rocca (born 1961) is an Irish-Italian former model and television presenter, who, in 1980, won the Miss Ireland title. The following year, she married footballer John Devine. Two years after their divorce in 1990 she met and later married, Northern Irish singer Van Morrison.

She is the daughter of Paddy and Maureen Rocca, and granddaughter of Italian immigrant Egidio Rocca who founded the successful business, Rocca Tiles.

Career
Rocca grew up in a large family with two brothers and three sisters. Rocca attended University College Dublin studying Greek and Roman Civilization and Italian and French Archaeology. She is fluent in several languages and has earned an MA degree from Trinity College in Dublin and also a degree from Bristol University.

She was named Miss Ireland in 1980 and was the number 3 finalist in the Miss International 1981 pageant. She worked in the family business and also modelled until she joined RTÉ in 1987 as a television presenter. In 1988, she co-hosted the Eurovision Song Contest with Pat Kenny in front of a worldwide audience of 600 million viewers. She continued to model, with occasional presenting jobs, such as the Miss World 1990 contest in London.

Rocca is now a psychology and motivational teacher with a master's degree in philosophy and English.

Personal life
She began dating Arsenal and Irish International footballer John Devine when she was 17 and they were married in 1981 and lived in England. The couple had two daughters, Danielle and Natasha, but separated in 1987 and she returned to Dublin with the children. They divorced in 1990. She was engaged to Cathal Ryan, son of multi-millionaire Tony Ryan who co-founded Ryanair and owned Guinness Peat Aviation. After living together for two years, they separated when Michelle was expecting their child, Claudia, who was born in April 1991. Upon Cathal Ryan's death in December 2007 of cancer, Rocca was quoted as saying, "He was a wonderful father to Claudia; he and I had a very good relationship over the past number of years and he will be greatly missed by all of us."

Rocca met Northern Irish singer-songwriter Van Morrison in the summer of 1992. They married in the mid-1990s and divorced on 24 March 2018. They have two children, Aibhe and Fionn Ivan. She was the second woman to appear on one of Morrison's album covers—1995's Days Like This. (The first was Morrison's first wife Janet "Planet" Rigsbee, who appeared on the cover of 1971's Tupelo Honey.) Rocca also appeared on the cover of the October 1994 tribute album, No Prima Donna: The Songs of Van Morrison.

Rocca has five children. She also has a granddaughter, who was born in February 2001.

See also
 List of Eurovision Song Contest presenters

References

Sources
 Rogan, Johnny (2006): Van Morrison : No Surrender, London:Vintage Books 
 Where Are They Now?, Irish Examiner, 30 August 1999

External links
 BP Fallon: Van and Michelle in New Orleans, 1996
 Michelle Rocca @ IMDb

1961 births
Living people
Television personalities from Dublin (city)
Irish socialites
Irish people of Italian descent
Van Morrison
Miss Ireland winners
Alumni of Trinity College Dublin
Alumni of the University of Bristol
Miss World 1980 delegates
Miss International 1981 delegates
RTÉ television presenters
Beauty pageant contestants from Ireland
Association footballers' wives and girlfriends